Bobrovsky 2-y is a rural locality (a khutor) and the administrative center of Bobrovskoye Rural Settlement, Serafimovichsky District, Volgograd Oblast, Russia. The population was 526 as of 2010. There are 15 streets.

Geography 
Bobrovsky 2-y is located on the Don River, 14 km south of Serafimovich (the district's administrative centre) by road. Zatonsky is the nearest rural locality.

References 

Rural localities in Serafimovichsky District